Alfred Russell may refer to:

 Alfred Russell (boxer) (1915–1966), British boxer
 Alfred Russell (artist) (1920–2007), American artist
 Alfred Francis Russell (1817–1884), president of Liberia